This is a list of all cricketers who have played first-class or List A matches for Allied Bank Limited cricket team. The team played 116 first-class matches between 1979 and 2005 and 85 List A matches between 1983 and 2005. Seasons given are first and last seasons; the player did not necessarily play in all the intervening seasons.

Players
 Aaley Haider, 1990/91-2004/05
 Aamer Hanif, 1994/95-2004/05
 Aamer Nazir, 1993/94-2002/03
 Aamer Sohail, 1992/93-2000/01
 Aaqib Javed, 1992/93-2002/03
 Abdur Rauf, 2003/04-2004/05
 Abid Butt, 1995/96-1997/98
 Aleem Dar, 1995/96
 Amin Lakhani, 1982/83-1984/85
 Arshad Khan, 1995/96-2004/05
 Ata-ur-Rehman, 1991/92-2001/02
 Ata-ur-Rehman, 1992/93-2004/05
 Athar Khan, 1978/79-1992/93
 Azeem Hafeez, 1982/83-1983/84
 Bilal Asad, 2002/03-2004/05
 Bilal Rana, 1992/93-1999/00
 Ehsan Butt, 1995/96-1999/00
 Farhan Adil, 2003/04
 Farooq Rasheed, 1978/79-1984/85
 Feroz Najamuddin, 1983/84-1984/85
 Humayun Farhat, 1997/98-2002/03
 Humayun Hussain, 1990/91-1999/00
 Ijaz Ahmed, 1994/95-2004/05
 Iqbal Saleem, 1995/96-2000/01
 Iqtidar Ali, 1978/79-1984/85
 Jahangir Khan sen, 1996/97
 Jalal-ud-Din, 1982/83-1984/85
 Kamran Khan, 1995/96-1997/98
 Kashif Mahmood, 2000/01
 Khalid Latif, 2003/04-2004/05
 Manzoor Akhtar, 1990/91-2004/05
 Masroor Hussain, 1995/96-1999/00
 Mazhar Alvi, 1978/79-1981
 Mohammad Akram, 1996/97-2000/01
 Mohammad Nawaz, 1993/94-2001/02
 Mohammad Salman, 2003/04-2004/05
 Mohammad Zahid, 1994/95-2004/05
 Mohsin Kamal, 1983/84
 Moinuddin, 1979/80-1991/92
 Nadeem Qureshi, 1978/79-1981
 Naseer Chughtai, 1982/83
 Naved Latif, 2001/02-2002/03
 Naved-ul-Hasan, 2001/02
 Raees-ur-Rehman, 1981-1984/85
 Raj Hans, 1991/92-1999/00
 Rameez Raja, 1983/84-1997/98
 Rasakh Akhtar, 1978/79
 Rashid Latif, 1996/97-2004/05
 Rifaqat Ali, 1992/93-1996/97
 Rizwan Aslam, 2003/04-2004/05
 Saleem Yousuf, 1982/83-1984/85
 Salman Qizilbash, 1978/79-1983/84
 Shahid Mahboob, 1982/83-1998/99
 Shahid Naqi, 1990/91-1995/96
 Shoaib Habib, 1978/79-1990/91
 Tahir Mughal, 2003/04-2004/05
 Tahir Nisar, 1978/79-1982/83
 Taimur Khan, 1997/98-2004/05
 Talat Masood, 1982/83-1984/85
 Tanvir Ahmed, 2000/01-2004/05
 Tauqir Haider, 1978/79-1979/80
 Usman Tariq, 2000/01-2004/05
 Wajahatullah Wasti, 1995/96-2004/05
 Waqar Younis, 2003/04
 Wasif Ali, 1999/00
 Zafar Ahmed, 1983/84-1984/85
 Zafar Mehdi, 1981-1991/92
 Zaki Ahmed, 1978/79-1979/80

References

Allied Bank Limited cricketers